P. alba  may refer to:
 Plumeria alba, a large evergreen shrub species native from Central America and the Caribbean
 Populus alba, the white poplar, a tree speciesnative from Spain and Morocco through central Europe to central Asia
 Prenanthes alba, the white rattlesnake root, a plant species
 Prosopis alba, the algarrobo blanco, a tree species found in Argentina
 Pseudofumaria alba, the white corydalis, a plant species

See also
 Alba (disambiguation)